Trio Beach is a gazetted beach facing the bay of Sam Sing Wan and located on Pak Sha Wan Peninsula, Sai Kung District, Hong Kong. The beach has barbecue pits and is managed by the Leisure and Cultural Services Department of the Hong Kong Government. The beach is 131 metres long and is rated as good to fair by the Environmental Protection Department for its water quality in the past twenty years.

History
On 18 July 2010, a dragon boat was swamped by the wakes from two passing speedboats and all 21 paddlers who were practising for the coming dragon boat competition at the beach fell into the sea. A 26-year-old woman was treated at Tseung Kwan O Hospital for her leg injury and was discharged.

In September 2018, the beach had to be temporarily closed due to the sewage being leaked into the sea near the beach from the Sai Kung Sewage Treatment Works. This was due to the Typhoon Mangkhut.

On 1 July 2020, a 68-year-old woman had drowned while swimming near the beach. She was unconscious when she was rescued by a lifeguard and was taken by an ambulance to Tseung Kwan O Hospital for treatment.

Usage
The beach is split in two by a rocky outcrop and a whopping lifeguard tower. The beach is also accessible by hiking for a healthier and more scenic option as well as kai-to from Hebe Haven Pier.

Features
The beach has the following features:
 BBQ pits (20 nos.)
 Changing rooms
 Showers
 Toilets
 Refreshment kiosk
 Water sports centre
 Playground

See also
 Beaches of Hong Kong

References

External links 

 Official website

Sai Kung District
Beaches of Hong Kong